Bloucher is an unincorporated historic community west of Odell in Hood River County, Oregon, United States.

Bloucher was a station on the Mount Hood Railroad named for local resident H. E. Bloucher. It was also known as Bloucher Spur.

References

External links
Images of Bloucher from Flickr

Unincorporated communities in Hood River County, Oregon
Unincorporated communities in Oregon